The Mercedes W14, officially Mercedes-AMG F1 W14 E Performance, is a Formula One racing car designed and constructed by the Mercedes-AMG Petronas Formula One Team competing in the 2023 Formula One World Championship. The W14 is driven by 7-time Formula One World Champion Lewis Hamilton and George Russell, who is racing his second season with the team.

Early design and development 
Team Principal Toto Wolff claims that the W14 will have "different DNA" to the W14's predecessor, the Mercedes W13, after a challenging 2022 campaign that had seen them out of the World Championship battle. The W14 was designed with a higher ride height with the aim to reduce porpoising, but made the car slower than the rest, and the car has a lot to be improved if it has to be brought back to the winning ways. 

At the launch, held on 15 February 2023, the W14 was revealed to have a black livery, much like its predecessors, the Mercedes F1 W11 of 2020 and the W12 of 2021, but unlike those aforementioned cars, the black livery on the car is not being primarily used to promote diversity, but to save weight after the team admitted to struggling with excess weight with its 2022 car, the W13, which had a traditional silver-painted livery. The black colour was created by leaving some parts as unpainted raw carbon whilst others are wrapped with matte black wrap.

Complete Formula One results
(key)

* Season still in progress.

References

External links
 Official website 

F1 W14